Kenneth Edgar Bennett (2 October 1921 – December 1994) was an English professional footballer who scored 50 goals from 187 appearances in the Football League playing for Southend United, Bournemouth & Boscombe Athletic, Brighton & Hove Albion and Crystal Palace.

Career
Bennett was born in Wood Green, north London, and began his football career before the Second World War with local club Wood Green Town. He joined Tottenham Hotspur during the war, and played for the club occasionally in the wartime competitions, but when the Football League resumed in 1946 he signed for Southend United. After two seasons he moved on to Bournemouth & Boscombe Athletic, a year later joining Southern League club Guildford City, and then, after another year, returning to the League with Brighton & Hove Albion. He was the club's top scorer in both the 1951–52 and 1952–53 seasons, with 19 and 13 goals respectively in all competitions, and then spent a year with Crystal Palace. In 1954 he returned to the Southern League, playing four games for Headington United. Bennett died in Rochford, Essex, in 1994 at the age of 73.

References

1921 births
1994 deaths
Footballers from Wood Green
English footballers
Association football forwards
Wood Green Town F.C. players
Tottenham Hotspur F.C. players
Southend United F.C. players
AFC Bournemouth players
Guildford City F.C. players
Brighton & Hove Albion F.C. players
Crystal Palace F.C. players
Oxford United F.C. players
English Football League players
Southern Football League players